Giuseppe Bommarito (born 3 November 1933) is an Italian sprinter. He competed in the men's 400 metres at the 1960 Summer Olympics.

References

External links
 

1933 births
Living people
Athletes (track and field) at the 1960 Summer Olympics
Italian male sprinters
Olympic athletes of Italy
Place of birth missing (living people)